Ravina is an Indian actress who acted in Dhallywood movies. She acted in the 1997 film Praner Cheye Priyo with Riaz. She also appeared in Sabdhan and Dolopoti, again opposite Riaz.

Selected filmography
 Praner Cheye Priyo
 Sabdhan
 Dolopoti

References

Living people
Indian film actresses
Actresses in Bengali cinema
Year of birth missing (living people)
Bangladeshi film actresses
People from Kolkata